The Nardi FN.316 was an Italian advanced fighter trainer monoplane developed by the Fratelli Nardi company from the Nardi FN.305.

Development
The FN.316 was an improved version of the Nardi FN.305, designed as an advanced fighter trainer. The prototype first flew in late 1941.  The FN.316 was a low-wing cantilever monoplane powered by a nose-mounted 270 hp (210 kW) Isotta Frashchini Beta RC 10 1Z. The engine had serious cooling problems and only an initial order for 50 aircraft was placed for the Italian Air Force. The production aircraft had modified tail units and the single-seater had an enclosed cockpit. Both single-seat (FN.316M) and two-seat (FN.316B) variants were produced.

Operational service
The two-seat FN.316Bs entered service with Italian Air Force flying schools in January 1942, followed by the one-seat FN.316Ms in June 1943. After the armistice seven aircraft were flown by the German Luftwaffe in Northern Italy

Variants
FN.316
Prototype, one built
FN.316B
Two-seater production variant, 19 built.
FN.316M
Single-seat production variant, 30 built.

Operators

Luftwaffe

Regia Aeronautica

Specifications (FN.316M)

References

 
 

FN.316
1940s Italian military trainer aircraft
Single-engined tractor aircraft
Aircraft first flown in 1941